The Norman Guitmund (died c. 1090–1095), Bishop of Aversa, was a Benedictine monk who was an opponent of the teachings of Berengar of Tours.

In his youth Guitmund entered the monastery of La-Croix-Saint-Leufroy in the Diocese of Évreux. By 1060 he was studying theology at the Abbey of Bec, where he had Lanfranc as teacher and Anselm as a fellow-student, each of them later Archbishop of Canterbury. In 1070 William the Conqueror called him to take up a diocese in England, to which the monk responded with his Oratio ad Guillelmum, denouncing the Norman Conquest.

In his native Normandy, Guitmund defended the doctrine of transubstantiation against Berengar of Tours. During the 1070s he wrote a  treatise on the Holy Eucharist, entitled De corporis et sanguinis Jesu Christi veritate in Eucharistia ("On the body and blood of Jesus Christ truly in the Eucharist"), which takes the familiar literary form of a dialogue between himself and a fellow monk, Roger, to present the doctrine of the real presence of Christ in the Eucharist. He attributes the perceived decay of the reserved sacrament, not as an accident of its essential substance (the orthodox view), but merely as a deception of our senses.  The first printed edition of Guitmund's De corporis et sanguinis was edited by Erasmus (Freiburg, 1530).

Shortly after Guitmund had published his treatise against Berengar, he obtained permission from his abbot, Odilo, to make a pilgrimage to Rome, where he lived for a time in a Roman monastery under the pseudonym of Christianus, which afforded him obscurity. Pope Urban II, formerly a monk at the Abbey of Cluny, appointed Guitmund as Bishop of Aversa in 1088.

Ordericus Vitalis (in his Historiae Ecclesiasticae, Book IV) states that Guitmund left his monastery, with permission, and went to Pope Gregory VII, who made him a cardinal. August Prévost, Ordericus' editor, states however: "Guitmond n'a jamais été élevé au cardinalat." Paul Fridolin Kehr, too, denies the cardinalate.

Notes and references

Bibliography
 Dell'Omo, M. (1993). "Per la storia dei monaci-vescovi nell'Italia normanna del secolo XI: ricerche biografiche su Guitmondo di La Croix-Saint-Leufroy, vescovo di Aversa", in: Benedictina 40 (1993), pp. 9–34. 
Kamp, Norbert (2000). "Le fonti per una biografia di Guitmondo d’Aversa," in: Guitmondo di Aversa, la cultura europea e la riforma gregoriana nel mezzogiorno..., vol. I, pp. 137 ff.
Orabona, L. (ed.) (2000). Guitmondo di Aversa, la cultura europea e la riforma gregoriana nel mezzogiorno. Atti del Convegno internazionale di studi, Cassino-Aversa, 13-14-15 novembre 1997. 2 vols. Napoli-Roma 2000. 
Shaughnessy, P. (1939). The Eucharistic Doctrine of Guitmund of Aversa. Roma 1939.

Catholic Encyclopedia: "Guitmund"

11th-century births
1090s deaths
11th-century Normans
French Benedictines
Italo-Norman Benedictines
11th-century Italian Roman Catholic bishops
Bishops of Aversa
Benedictine theologians
Benedictine bishops
11th-century French Catholic theologians
Year of birth unknown
11th-century Latin writers